Antietam  may refer to:

Places

Maryland
Antietam, Maryland, an unincorporated community four miles south of the battlefield of the Battle of Antietam
Antietam Iron Furnace Site and Antietam Village
Antietam Hall
Antietam Creek, a tributary of the Potomac River in Pennsylvania and Western Maryland; source name for the battle
Antietam National Battlefield, an American national park

Pennsylvania
Antietam Creek (Schuylkill River), a tributary of the Schuylkill River
Antietam Lake, a reservoir in Berks County

Arts, entertainment, games and media
Antietam (band), US indie rock band
"Antietam", a song by Billy Corgan
 Antietam: The Bloodiest Day, 17 September 1862, a 1975 board wargame that simulates the American Civil War Battle
Battleground 5: Antietam, a strategy computer game
Sid Meier's Antietam!, a tactical computer game

Military
Battle of Antietam, a major American Civil War battle
Maryland Campaign, also known as the Antietam Campaign, an American Civil War invasion
, three US Navy ships